Norwood Park Historic District is a national historic district located at Asheville, Buncombe County, North Carolina.  The district encompasses 154 contributing buildings and one contributing structures in a predominantly residential section of Asheville. The property was largely developed in the first three decades of the 20th century, and includes representative examples of Colonial Revival and Bungalow style dwellings.

It was listed on the National Register of Historic Places in 2008.

Gallery

References

Houses on the National Register of Historic Places in North Carolina
Historic districts on the National Register of Historic Places in North Carolina
Colonial Revival architecture in North Carolina
Houses in Asheville, North Carolina
National Register of Historic Places in Buncombe County, North Carolina